Camelia Voinea (born 1 March 1970) is a retired Romanian artistic gymnast, who competed in international events between 1984 and 1988. She was best known for her powerful tumbling, her innovative 1986–87 floor exercise that featured breakdancing elements, and for being the first gymnast to tumble a double layout to punch front somersault. In 1987 she scored a perfect ten for the floor exercise  during the team competition event at the World Championships.

Career
Voinea started to train for gymnastics at the CSS 1 Farul Constanța Club under the direction of coach Matei Stănei. Later she trained with the national team at Deva under coaches Adrian Goreac, Adrian Stan, and Maria Cosma. Her international debut was at the Balkan Championships (1984) where she placed first with the team, second all-around, first on floor, and second on vault and uneven bars. The 1985 World Championships in Montreal was her first major international competition. She won silver with the team, placed fourth in the uneven bars event, and ninth in the all-around. One year later she was invited to compete in the World Cup in Beijing.

At the 1987 European Championships in Moscow, Voinea won silver in the floor finals and she tied with Laura Munoz for eighth place in the all-around. Together with Aurelia Dobre, Eugenia Golea, Celestina Popa, Daniela Silivaș and Ecaterina Szabo, Voinea was a member of the gold medal winning team at the 1987 World Artistic Gymnastics Championships in Rotterdam, The Netherlands. During the floor event in the team optional finals Voinea, Dobre and Silivaș scored three consecutive 10s from the judges. It was the first time in gymnastics history that three teammates had gotten perfect scores in succession. Voinea brought the crowd alive in her floor routine with a funky display of break dancing.
One year later, Voinea was  a member of the silver winning team at the 1988 Summer Olympics.

Post retirement
Voinea retired after the 1988 Olympic Games. Following her retirement she attended the University of Bucharest for two years, leaving mid-way for a coaching opportunity in Italy. She returned home in 1994, to coach alongside her first coach Matei Stănei. The money Voinea earned while coaching abroad was invested in an agricultural business near Constanța.

Voinea coaches her daughter Sabrina, born 2007.

References

External links 
 
 
 

1970 births
Living people
Sportspeople from Constanța
Romanian female artistic gymnasts
Gymnasts at the 1988 Summer Olympics
Olympic gymnasts of Romania
Olympic silver medalists for Romania
Olympic medalists in gymnastics
Medalists at the World Artistic Gymnastics Championships
Romanian gymnastics coaches
Medalists at the 1988 Summer Olympics